Jimmy Kamghain (born 3 July 1992, Avignon) is a French footballer, who is currently playing for Poissy.

Career
Jimmy Kamghain began his career with French side P.S.G in 2006 and he signed a professional contract in 2009, but he never made a first team appearance during his time at the Parc des Princes. He currently plays for Kortrijk in the Belgian Pro League (D1), having signed on a free transfer from P.S.G, and Kamghain made his debut for Kortrijk on the opening day of the season, which was a 1-1 draw against Anderlecht, Kamghain played 51 minutes, but he was substituted on the 52nd minute. Kamghain has currently made seven league appearances at the Guldensporen Stadion.

References

1992 births
Living people
Sportspeople from Avignon
French footballers
K.V. Kortrijk players
K.S.V. Roeselare players
AS Poissy players
Belgian Pro League players
Challenger Pro League players
French expatriate footballers
Expatriate footballers in Belgium
Association football forwards
French sportspeople of Cameroonian descent